Lavungu (also spelt Lavanggu) is a village in the Solomon Islands, on Rennell Island in the Rennell and Bellona province.

Location
Travel easterly for approx 1½ hrs, 30 km from Tigoa. Good for lobster diving, and has a lovely reef for 						swimming/snorkelling and a golden sand beach.

Port

MV Renbell anchors about 1 km off shore and supplies are shipped over the reef using banana boats / long boats.

Population

120 people approx.

Religion
(West Village) SSEC  
(East Village) BAPTIST

Police
Generally policing is serviced by the Tigoa police station

Populated places in Rennell and Bellona Province